Paul Alan Redfarn (born 23 December 1963) is an English cricketer.  Redfarn is a right-handed batsman who plays as a wicket-keeper.  He was born in Cambridge, Cambridgeshire.

Redfarn made his Minor Counties Championship debut for Cambridgeshire in 1982 against Norfolk.  From 1982 to 1990, he represented the county in 32 Championship matches, the last of which came against Lincolnshire.  His MCCA Knockout Trophy debut for the county came in 1983 against Dorset.  From 1983 to 1990 he represented the county in 12 Trophy matches, the last of which came against Norfolk.  His debut List A appearance for the county came in the 1st round of the 1983 NatWest Trophy against Middlesex.  He represented the county in 2 further List A matches against Warwickshire in the 1st round of the 1983 NatWest Trophy and Worcestershire in the 1989 NatWest Trophy.  In his 3 matches, he scored 30 runs at a batting average of 10.00, with a high score of 21.

He currently plays club cricket for Burwell Cricket Club in the East Anglian Premier Cricket League.

References

External links
Paul Redfart at Cricinfo
Paul Redfart at CricketArchive

1963 births
Living people
Sportspeople from Cambridge
English cricketers
Cambridgeshire cricketers